August Babberger (8 December 1885 – 3 September 1936) was a German painter. His work was part of the painting event in the art competition at the 1928 Summer Olympics.

References

1885 births
1936 deaths
20th-century German painters
20th-century German male artists
German male painters
Olympic competitors in art competitions
People from Lörrach (district)